Zayeltsovsky District is an administrative district (raion) of Central Okrug, one of the 10 raions of Novosibirsk, Russia. The area of the district is 83 sq km (32 sq mi). Population: 149, 100 (2017).

History
Zayeltsovsky City District was established March 25, 1940.

Streets

Architecture

Religion

Christianity

Zayeltsovsky Bor
Zayeltsovsky Bor is a pine forest. Its territory covers 3,100 hectares.

Tourist attractions in The Zayeltsovsky Bor

Novosibirsk Zoo
Novosibirsk Zoo is located in the Zayeltsovsky Bor. The zoo has around 11,000 animals (738 species).

Zayeltsovsky Park
The Zayeltsovsky Park was opened in 1932.

Small West Siberian Railway
The Small West Siberian Railway or Novosibirsk Children's Railway is a children's railway, opened on 4 June 2005.

Zayeltsovskoye Cemetery
The Zayeltsovskoye Cemetery is a cemetery in the Zayeltsovsky Bor. The area of the graveyard is about 200 hectares.

Economy

Industry
 Ekran Plant
 Novosibirsk Electrovacuum Plant (NEVZ-Soyuz)
 Novosibirsk Instrument-Building Plant
 Novosibirsk Meat Canning Plant
 Novosibirsk Plant of Semiconductor Devices

Education
 Novosibirsk State Medical University
 Siberian State Transport University
 Siberian Cadet Corps
 Siberian Independent Institute
 Novosibirsk Medical College

Medicine
 City Hospital No. 1
 Novosibirsk gerontological center
 Novosibirsk TB Research Institute

Transportation

Railway
One railway stations is located in the district (Gagarinskaya Railway Station).

Metro
Two Novosibirsk Metro stations are located in the district: Gagarinskaya and Zayeltsovskaya.

References